The 2019–20 Boise State Broncos women's basketball team represented Boise State University during the 2019–20 NCAA Division I women's basketball season. The Broncos, led by fifteenth-year head coach Gordy Presnell, played their home games at ExtraMile Arena and competed as members of the Mountain West Conference (MWC).

Previous season
The Broncos finished last season with a 28–5 record. They won the MWC regular season and tournament titles. They lost in the First Round of the NCAA tournament at Oregon State.

Roster

'

Schedule

|-
!colspan=9 style=| Exhibition

|-
!colspan=9 style=| Regular season

|-
!colspan=9 style=| MWC Tournament

|-
!colspan=9 style=| NCAA tournament

References

Boise State Broncos women's basketball seasons
Boise State
Boise State Broncos women's
Boise State Broncos women's